Roman Furger (born 10 February 1990) is a Swiss cross-country skier who represents the club Schattdorf.

He competed at the FIS Nordic World Ski Championships 2017 in Lahti, Finland.

Cross-country skiing results
All results are sourced from the International Ski Federation (FIS).

Olympic Games

Distance reduced to 30 km due to weather conditions.

World Championships

World Cup

Season standings

Team podiums
 2 podiums – (1 , 1 )

References

External links 

1990 births
Living people
Swiss male cross-country skiers
Tour de Ski skiers
Cross-country skiers at the 2018 Winter Olympics
Cross-country skiers at the 2022 Winter Olympics
Olympic cross-country skiers of Switzerland
People from the canton of Uri